Pierre Mandonnet (26 February 1858 – 4 January 1936) was a French-born, Belgian Dominican historian, important in the neo-Thomist trend of historiography and the recovery of medieval philosophy. He made his reputation with a study of Siger of Brabant.

Biography
Pierre Mandonnet was born in Beaumont, Puy-de-Dôme on 4 January 1936.

In 1887 he was ordained as a priest, and from 1891 to 1919, was a professor of church history at the University of Fribourg. In 1902/03 he served as university rector.

He died in Le Saulchoir on 4 January 1936.

Works
Les Dominicains et la découverte de l'Amérique, (1893)
Siger de Brabant et l'averroïsme latin au xiiie siècle (2 volumes, 1908–11)
Des écrits authentiques de S. Thomas d'Aquin, (1910)
Bibliographie thomiste (1921) with J. A. Destrez, later edition 1960.
Dante le théologien ; introduction à l'intelligence de la vie, des œuvres et de l'art de Dante Alighieri (1935).
Saint Dominique: l'idée, l'homme et l'oeuvre (1921); translated into English in 1944 as St. Dominic and his work (2 parts).

Notes

External links
St. Dominic and His Work, online translated text

1858 births
1936 deaths
Belgian Dominicans
20th-century Belgian historians
Academic staff of the University of Fribourg
People from Puy-de-Dôme
Contributors to the Catholic Encyclopedia
19th-century Belgian historians